The 2021–22 season was the 117th season of competitive football in Turkey.

Pre-season

League tables

Süper Lig

1.Lig

Turkish Cup

Final

National team

Friendlies

2022 FIFA World Cup qualification

Group G

Second round

Turkish clubs in Europe

UEFA Champions League

Second qualifying round

Group stage

Group C

UEFA Europa League

Third qualifying round

Play-off round

Group stage

Group D

Group E

Knockout stage

Round of 16

UEFA Europa Conference League

Qualifying phase and play-off round

Second qualifying round

Third qualifying round

Play-off round

Knockout stage

Knockout round play-offs

References

 
Seasons in Turkish football
Turkish 2021